Moses Macdonald (April 8, 1815 – October 18, 1869) was an American attorney and Democratic politician in the U.S. state of Maine. He served as a member of the United States House of Representatives, the Maine State Senate and as Speaker of the Maine House of Representatives during the 1800s.

Early life and career
Macdonald was born in Limerick, Massachusetts (now in Maine) and was the son of major General John Macdonald and Lydia Wiley Macdonald. He received an academic education and attended Phillips Academy. He studied law, was admitted to the bar in 1837 and began the practice of law in Biddeford, Maine in 1837.

Political career
He served as a member of the Maine House of Representatives in 1841, 1842, and 1845. He was the Speaker of the Maine House of Representatives in 1845 and served in the Maine Senate in 1847. He was the Maine State Treasurer from 1847 to 1850.

Macdonald was elected as a Democratic candidate to the Thirty-second and Thirty-third Congresses, serving from March 4, 1851 – March 3, 1855. He was chairman of the Committee on Revolutionary Claims during the Thirty-second Congress.

After leaving Congress, he was appointed collector of customs at Portland, Maine by President James Buchanan in 1857 and served until 1861. He died in Saco, Maine in 1869 at the age of 54 and was buried in Laurel Hill Cemetery there.

References

External links

	

1815 births
1869 deaths
Maine lawyers
Democratic Party Maine state senators
People from Limerick, Maine
Speakers of the Maine House of Representatives
State treasurers of Maine
Phillips Academy alumni
Democratic Party members of the United States House of Representatives from Maine
19th-century American politicians
19th-century American lawyers